Addicted to Life  is an anti drug campaign aiming to create awareness on drugs, including alcohol. It was launched in Kerala, India by the Chief Minister Oommen Chandy on 6 August 2014 with the backing of the excise department and the Kerala state Beverages Corporation. The campaign has been a success from its initial stage itself.

References

External links
 Addicted to life Website

Anti-drugs public service announcements
Indian advertising slogans
2014 in India
2014 introductions